Berdeen Falls is a series of three waterfalls located in Whatcom County, Washington. The  falls are on a stretch of Bacon Creek (a tributary of the Skagit River) downstream of Berdeen Lake.The drops include  a  horsetail, a  bedrock slide, and a  plunge waterfall.

Notes

Waterfalls of Washington (state)
North Cascades of Washington (state)
Waterfalls of Whatcom County, Washington
Tiered waterfalls